Randy Greif is a noise music composer who often incorporates electronic music and musique concrete collage with spoken word and field recordings.

Early career
Since the mid-1970s, Greif has composed electronic music, musique concrete and computer-generated music and in 1983 he started the DIY label Swinging Axe Productions (SAP) to release his own work and those of like-minded artists. The various alias names Greif has recorded under include Screaming Dukduks and Shadowbug 4. During the first few years of his career, only a handful of cassette-only releases were available, including those by Sound of Pig, Controlled Bleeding, Merzbow, Illusion of Safety and If, Bwana. In 1988 a long 8 minute track by Greif called The Rift In The Earth was selected to appear on the Tellus Audio Cassette Magazine issue #20 Media Myth, which brought further international attention to his work.

Swinging Axe Productions
In 1985 Swinging Axe Productions released on cassette tape a collaboration between Randy Greif and writer Alva Svoboda titled Easy Green Proof that used Svoboda's disturbing poems in which his readings were manipulated and set against electronic atmospheres. Also released was location recordings from Papua New Guinea which featured not only indigenous music but folk stories, theater and a church meeting in Pidgin English. This was the first of several such releases, the other two being from Amazonia and Thailand.

RRR label
The first album done for another label was his Bacteria and Gravity for the RRR label in 1987 on which the second side is one long piece filled with tribal rhythms, other-worldly voices and odd sounds such a bullfrog and car horn. Shortly after this release, Greif teamed up with Mikail Bohonus of WarWorld to form Static Effect, who performed improvisational music. They toured North America and Canada and released a number of cassettes and vinyl before disbanding in 1990.

Staalplaat label
In 1990 Greif had begun work on his most ambitious project to date: a 6-hour musical and textural setting for Lewis Carroll's Alice in Wonderland. The spoken text is often deconstructed into phonemes of pure sound and then returned to recognizable words. This project took 5 years and the CDs were released serially on the Staalplaat label in special packaging.

The next CD, The Barnacles Inside, also on the Staalplaat label, was released in 1994. Although most tracks on this CD incorporate manipulated voices, there is no discernible text. About this same time Greif began a project with Dan Burke of Illusion of Safety, which after a year of collaborating by exchanging sequences, sounds, and tapes through the mail resulted in Fragment 56. The intention of this project was to use environmental sounds, voices, and atmospheres to create the feeling of a memory or a dream not wholly remembered. Shortly after this release, a split CD with Greif and Illusion of Safety came out titled In Our Little Bodies. Greif's material here was closer to song structure but that definitely does not mean conventions such as melody, choruses, and harmonies. They are highly claustrophobic and obsessive shorter pieces, some of which again feature the voice of Alva Svoboda, sampled and manipulated.

Soleilmoon label
Randy Greif's Verdi's Requiem was released on the Soleilmoon label in Nov. 1997. This is an attempt to abstract the events of Verdi's life in terms of music. The events, however, are all imagined by Greif, and actually did not happen. 

In subsequent years, Greif participated with a group called His Masters Voice (or alternately Stylus) which released a CD on Manifold and are featured on a CD from Freedom in a Vacuum / Swinging Axe called Globus and Decibel. Greif's work also appeared on numerous compilations, notably To Step Outside And Keep Walking which has approximately 20 minutes of exclusive material.

Three-CD set
In 1999, Soleilmoon released a 3-CD set wherein Greif collaborated with Robin Storey (of Rapoon/Zoviet France) and Nigel Ayers (of Nocturnal Emissions). This CD explores a very ambient side of their work, but retains a disturbing edge. For one of the 3 CDs, Randy used Nigel's source material, a second was created by Robin using Randy's, and the third had Nigel using Robin's material.

Shadowbug 4
Randy Greif also released a CD on Soleilmoon in 1999 under the name of Shadowbug 4, titled Tiny Voices of Love And Fear. These lean more towards song structure, although the instrumental tracks push the limits of that definition. The only vocals used are extremely chopped up and manipulated electronically. The long out-of-print 5-CD set of Alice in Wonderland was re-issued on Soleilmoon in 2000 with new artwork as well as a set of Alice in Wonderland trading cards that were published in conjunction with the release.

War of the World
2001 saw the release of Randy Greif's War of the World on Soleilmoon. As a follow-up to his 6-hour electro-psycho adaptation of Alice in Wonderland, Greif returned to putting classic literature through the sonic meat-grinder. This time around, though, the work was far more abstracted, and used the novel as more of a springboard for contemporary ideas relating to war—on a global level, a psychological level, and our own resistance to evolving from organic to digital beings.

Even more than the novel itself, Greif incorporated the Orson Welles radio-drama hoax to explore the realm of disinformation and scrambled information, as well as the audience reaction of fear, even to the point of suicide, when faced with the unknown. War of the World is subtitled "an emergency broadcast" as its overall effect was to approximate the feeling of listening to radio transmissions in an emergency situation (inspired during the Northridge earthquake). The feeling is sometimes a jumbled confusion of reports, snippets of speech with interference, electronic noises, and other mysterious bits and pieces. Then, later, to actually meld into the emergency drama itself complete with (non-musical) soundtrack.

Second Shadowbug 4 CD
Also in 2001, Randy Greif released the second Shadowbug 4 CD, titled We Are Beginning Our Descent, and continued his themes of depression and angst by way of dark ambience, slow beats, glitchy electronics and cut-up voices. There are even a few moments here of odd orchestral arrangements amid the pulses and unrecognizable sounds.

Feature film
During the years between 2001 and 2006, Greif wrote and directed the feature film The Three Trials with the following description: "Catherine, a nun with a unique form of narcolepsy, attempts to lose herself in the worlds of religion, adolescent fantasy, and finally masochistic devotion to a man. Her husband accommodates her masochism with increasingly extreme and bizarre rituals. With an experimental and ground-breaking format, The Three Trials incorporates surreal narrative, music video, and abstract imagery. The viewer is left to interpret what is real, what is dream, and what is false narrative in this feverish, pitch-black comedy with a smorgasbord of sexual fetishes." The film incorporates his own music along with many of his collaborators and like-minded artists from industrial music such as: Nurse With Wound, SPK, Rapoon, Controlled Bleeding, Lustmord, Illusion of Safety, Muslimgauze, Shadowbug 4, Skin Chamber

Later releases
In 2007 Greif released Narcoleptic Cells on the Thisco label from Portugal. The album is entirely created from spoken word, but is abstracted into sonic atmospheres rather than as a verbal narrative. Also in 2007 a CD in collaboration with Anna Homler, Brad Cooper and Adam Smith (under the name of Drift) was released on his own Swinging Axe label entitled Bypass Through The Sky. The same year, and also on the Swinging Axe label, a third Shadowbug 4 CD was released called A Thousand Hits Later.
In 2009, Greif was featured in the documentary film Grindstone Redux discussing the cassette culture underground of the 1980s.
Alice In Wonderland was released in its 3rd edition, with different packaging and artwork, in 2010 on the Soleilmoon label.

Discography and filmography

Cassettes
 1983 - It's In A Box
 1983 - Screaming Dukduks
 1983 - Primitive Missiles
 1983 - Seizure Boys/Max and Mel
 1984 - Fuck the Dog
 1984 - Lost Contact
 1985 - Wireless Spine Review
 1985 - Easy Green Proof
 1986 - Golden Joy Club
 1987 - Live In L.A.
 1988 - Tower Of Iron
 1989 - Dead Game In Any Weather
 1990 - Siamese Twin Reflex
 1990 - Static Effect Live
 1991 - In A Foreign Tongue

LPs
 1987 - Bacteria And Gravity
 1989 - Certain Random Firings

CDs
 1990–92 - Alice in Wonderland 1-5
 1994 - To Step Outside And Keep Walking
 1994 - The Barnacles Inside
 1995 - Fragment 56
 1995 - In Our Little Bodies
 1997 - Globus And Decibel
 1997 - Singing The Boundaries
 1997 - Verdi's Requiem
 1997 - Oedipus Brain Foil
 1999 - Shadowbug 4 - Tiny Voices Of Love And Fear
 2001 - War Of The World
 2001 - Shadowbug 4 We Are Beginning Our Descent
 2007 - Shadowbug 4 A Thousand Hits Later
 2007 - (with Drift) -- Bypass Through The Sky
 2007 - Narcoleptic Cells

Film
 2006 - The Three Trials

External links 
 Randy Greif track "The Rift In The Earth" (8:15) on Tellus Audio Cassette Magazine #20 "Media Myth" (1988)
  "Soleimoon" Label Official Site
  "Grindstone Redux Official Site

References

Male composers
1957 births
Living people
Soleilmoon artists
Postmodern artists
American sound artists
American experimental musicians
Experimental composers
American noise musicians
Male classical composers
20th-century American composers
20th-century American male musicians
Cassette culture 1970s–1990s